Anthony Paul Jefferies (born July 1, 1985), known professionally as Nineteen85, is a Canadian record producer and songwriter. Nineteen85 holds the distinction of winning an ASCAP Music Award back-to-back in 2014 and 2015.

He is best known for producing records for Drake, notably some of his most successful singles, "One Dance", "Hotline Bling" and "Hold On, We're Going Home". In 2014 he was named by Complex magazine as one of 15 new producers to watch for. In 2015, he founded the R&B duo Dvsn with singer Daniel Daley. He has been nominated for three Grammys, including for "Producer of the Year (Non-Classical)".

Production discography

Singles produced

Other songs

2011

Donnis – Southern Lights 

 08. "Everybody"

Shaun Boothe – Waiting Room 

 02. "Do It For You" (featuring Kim Davis)
03. "Let Me Go (Remix)" (featuring CyHi The Prynce)
04. "One Side"
07. "Poor Boy (Remix)" (featuring Kardinal Offishall)
08. "1 2 3" (featuring STS)
09. "The Arena" (featuring Nadia Stone)
12. "Safe To Say"

2013

Juicy J – Stay Trippy 
 18. "Having Sex" (featuring Trina and 2 Chainz) (produced by Supa Dups, co-produced by Nineteen85)

Drake – Nothing Was the Same 

 12. "Too Much" (produced with Sampha)

Tiara Thomas – Dear Sallie Mae 

 03. "Tell Me Something"

R. Kelly – Black Panties 
09. "My Story" (featuring 2 Chainz) (produced with R. Kelly)

2014

P. Reign – Dear America 

 01. "DnF" (featuring Drake & Future)

Jennifer Hudson – JHUD 
 01. "Dangerous" (produced with Stephen Kozmeniuk)

Jessie Ware – Tough Love 
 11. "Desire"

2016

Majid Jordan – Majid Jordan 

 11. "King City" (produced with Majid Jordan)

dvsn – Sept. 5th 
 01. "With Me"
 02. "Too Deep"
 03. "Try / Effortless" (co-produced by Noël Cadastre and Stephen Kozmeniuk)
 04. "Do It Well"
 05. "In + Out"
 06. "Sept. 5th"
 07. "Hallucinations" (produced with Stephen Kozmeniuk)
 08. "Another One"
 09. "Angela"
 10. "The Line"

Drake – Views 
 05. "Hype" (produced with Boi-1da, co-produced by The Beat Bully, add. production by Cubeatz)
 08. "With You" (featuring PartyNextDoor) (produced by Murda Beatz, add. production by Nineteen85 & Cardiak)
 09. "Faithful" (featuring Pimp C and dvsn) (produced by 40, co-produced by Boi-1da & Nineteen85)
 14. "Childs Play" (produced by 40, add. production by Majid Jordan, Metro Boomin & Nineteen85)

PartyNextDoor – PartyNextDoor 3 
 04. "Not Nice" (co-produced by 40 & Supa Dups)

James Vincent McMorrow – We Move 

 01. "Rising Water" (produced with James Vincent McMorrow, co-written by James Vincent McMorrow and Paul Jeffries)
03. "Last Story" (produced with James Vincent McMorrow)
06. "Get Low"
09. "Surreal" (co-produced by James Vincent McMorrow and Ross Dowling)

2017

Bleachers — Gone Now 
 07. "Let's Get Married" (produced with Jack Antonoff)

Drake – More Life 
 05. "Get It Together" (featuring Black Coffee and Jorja Smith) (add. production by 40)
 06. "Madiba Riddim" (produced with Frank Dukes, add. production by Charlie Handsome)

dvsn – Morning After 
 1. “Run Away”
 2. “Nuh Time / Tek Time”
 3. “Keep Calm”
 4. "Think About Me"
 5. “Don’t Choose”
 6. “Mood”
 7. “P.O.V.”
 8. “You Do”
 9. “Morning After”
 10. “Can’t Wait”
 11. “Claim”
 12. “Body Smile”
 13. “Conversations in a Diner”

2018

Travis Scott – Astroworld 
 17. "Coffee Bean"

Mariah Carey – Caution 
 1. "GTFO"

Future – Future Hndrxx Presents: The Wizrd 
 20. "Tricks on Me"

2019

Pvrx – 3.14 
 2. Stay With Me
 3. Nun New

Awards and nominations

Grammy Awards 

!
|-
| style="text-align:center;" rowspan="3"| 2017
| "Hotline Bling" (as songwriter)
| Best Rap Song
| 
| rowspan="3"|
|-
| Nineteen85
| Producer of the Year, Non-Classical
| 
|-
| Views (as producer)
| Album of the Year
|

References 

1985 births
Living people
Black Canadian musicians
Canadian people of Jamaican descent
Canadian record producers
Canadian hip hop record producers
Canadian songwriters
Grammy Award winners for rap music
Musicians from Toronto
Writers from Scarborough, Toronto